William Graham (March 16, 1782 – August 17, 1858) was a Speaker of the Indiana House of Representatives and Congressman from Indiana. Born at sea, Graham settled with his parents in Harrodsburg, Kentucky. He attended the public schools. He moved to Vallonia, Indiana, in 1811 and engaged in agricultural pursuits. He was elected to serve as member of the Indiana Territory's house of representatives in 1812 and was elected as delegate from Washington County to the State constitutional convention in 1816. He was elected six times as a member of the Indiana House of Representatives from 1816 until 1821, and was speaker of the house during the 1820-1821 session. He was elected and served four terms in the Indiana Senate  from 1821 until 1833, representing Jackson County.

Graham was elected as a Whig to the Twenty-fifth Congress (March 4, 1837 – March 3, 1839). He was an unsuccessful candidate for reelection in 1838 to the Twenty-sixth Congress. Returning home, he resumed agricultural pursuits until his death near Vallonia, Indiana, August 17, 1858. He was interred in the White Church Cemetery, Vallonia, Indiana.

References

1782 births
1858 deaths
Speakers of the Indiana House of Representatives
American Disciples of Christ
People from Jackson County, Indiana
Delegates to the 1816 Indiana constitutional convention
Whig Party members of the United States House of Representatives from Indiana
People from Harrodsburg, Kentucky
19th-century American politicians
People born at sea